The Kutaisi or Kutais Governorate was a province (guberniya) of the Caucasus Viceroyalty of the Russian Empire. It roughly corresponded to most of western Georgia throughout most of its existence, and most of the Artvin Province (except the Hopa and Yusufeli districts) of Turkey between 1878 and 1903. Created out of part of the former Georgia-Imeretia Governorate in 1846, the governorate also included Akhaltsikhe uezd before its cession to the Tiflis Governorate in 1867. The Kutaisi Governorate bordered the Sukhumi Okrug to the northwest, the Kuban Oblast to the north, the Terek Oblast to the northeast, the Tiflis Governorate to the southeast, the Batum Oblast to the southwest, and the Black Sea to the west. The governorate was eponymously named for its administrative center, Kutais (present-day Kutaisi).

History 
The Kutaisi Governorate was formed in 1846 as a result of the division of the Georgia-Imeretia Governorate. In 1883, the governorate included the Sukhumi Okrug and two districts (Artvin and Batum) of the then abolished Batum Oblast. In 1903, the Artvin and Batum districts were detached and re-formed into the Batum Oblast. In 1905, the Sukhumi Okrug also received the status of a special district of the Russian Empire, tantamount to a governorate or oblast.

Following the Russian Revolution, in 1918 the Kutaisi Governorate became part of the short-lived Georgian Democratic Republic.

Administrative divisions 

The counties (uezds) of the Kutaisi Governorate in 1917 were as follows:

Demographics

Russian Empire census (1897) 
The plurality of the population indicated Georgian to be their mother tongue, with significant Imeretian and Mingrelian speaking minorities who were considered to be within the Kartvelian language group.

Kavkazskiy kalendar 
The population total of the governorate is slightly less than in 1897 due to the province's administrative reorganization involving the detachment of the Artvin, Batum and Sukhumi okrugs (to be administered separately):

Notes

References

Bibliography

External links 
 

 
Caucasus Viceroyalty (1801–1917)
Governorates of the Caucasus
Kutaisi
Modern history of Georgia (country)
States and territories established in 1846
States and territories disestablished in 1917
1840s establishments in Georgia (country)
1917 disestablishments in Georgia (country)
1846 establishments in the Russian Empire
1917 disestablishments in Russia